Mustapha Traoré (born 7 September 1982) is a French former professional football who played as a defender.

Career 
Born in Paris, Traoré began his career in 2002 with USON Mondeville in CFA 2. In 2005, he was transferred to Stade Malherbe Caen. At Caen he made his professional debut on 7 October 2005 in 2–0 away wine against Dijon.

Honours 
Caen
 Ligue 2: runner-up 2006–07

References

External links 
 
 

Living people
1982 births
Association football defenders
French footballers
Footballers from Paris
French people of Malian descent
Red Star F.C. players
Stade Malherbe Caen players
Ligue 1 players
Ligue 2 players
Championnat National 2 players